The Narym Pony is similar to the Ob pony breed and originated near the same area in the central of the region near the Ob River of Western Siberia. The two breeds live under much the same ecological and economical conditions, and may be considered two groups or types of the same breed of northern forest horse. It stands between 13 and 14 hands high.

The Narym Pony is larger than the Ob pony and is crossed with draft horses and trotters in the southern part of the breeding area. In the north, it is bred pure.

References

 International Encyclopedia of Horse Breeds - written by Bonnie Hendricks - page307

Horse breeds
Horse breeds originating in Russia